Amos Rapoport (28 March 1929, Warsaw) is an architect and one of the founders of Environment-Behavior Studies (EBS). He is the author of over 200 academic publications in this field, including books that have been translated into foreign languages, including French, Spanish, German, Persian, Japanese, Korean and Chinese. He has held honorable and visiting positions in many universities around the globe, is professor emeritus at the University of Wisconsin-Milwaukee.

His work has focused mainly on the role of cultural variables, cross-cultural studies, and theory development and synthesis. His influential book House Form and Culture explores how culture, human behavior, and the environment affect house form.

Early life
Rapoport was born on 28 March 1929 in Warsaw, Poland. In 1939, he and his parents fled Warsaw and after crossing the USSR, they found refuge in Shanghai, where they spent the war in the Japanese-controlled ghetto. Amos attended the Shanghai Jewish School. Following the Japanese surrender, he emigrated to Australia, where the family settled in Melbourne. In 1955 he graduated with a Bachelor of Architecture degree from the University of Melbourne. In 1957 he graduated  with an MA from Rice University.

Academic career
Rapoport has taught at the University of Melbourne, University of California, Berkeley, University College London and University of Sydney. From 1972 until his retirement in 2001 he taught at the University of Wisconsin–Milwaukee where he was a Distinguished Professor in the School of Architecture and Urban Planning. His main aim was to define the importance of culture in the built environment and architecture, this is especially highlighted in his 1969 book House Form and Culture. He has also held visiting appointments in Argentina, Australia, Brazil, Canada, Israel, Mexico, Puerto Rico, India, Switzerland, Turkey and the U.K., among other places.

Books
1969 - House Form and Culture
1976 - The Mutual Interaction of People and Their Built Environment. A Cross-Cultural Perspective.
1977 - Human Aspects of Urban Form: Towards a Man-Environment Approach to Urban Form and Design
1982 - The Meaning of the Built Environment: A Nonverbal Communication Approach
1990 - History and Precedent in Environmental Design
2003 - Culture, Architecture, and Design

References

External links
The Amos Rapoport Image Collection of Vernacular Design, collection of over 30,000 images from more than 70 countries.

20th-century American architects
Environmental psychologists
1929 births
Living people
Polish emigrants to the United States
University of Melbourne alumni
Rice University alumni
University of Wisconsin–Milwaukee faculty
American people of Polish-Jewish descent
21st-century American architects